Mabel Bramwell Parton (22 July 1881 – 12 August 1962) was a British tennis player who won a bronze medal at the 1912 Summer Olympics in Stockholm.

Parton had won a place in the semi-final but lost to Edith Hannam, she then won the bronze medal final 6–3, 6–3 against Sigrid Fick of Sweden.

Family life
Parton was born on 22 July 1881 at Hampstead in London as Mabel Bramwell Squire the daughter of Peter and Mabel Squire. Parton married firstly solicitor Ernest George Parton in 1906 and then tennis player Theodore Mavrogordato in 1924.

References

1881 births
1962 deaths
English female tennis players
Olympic bronze medallists for Great Britain
Olympic tennis players of Great Britain
Tennis players at the 1912 Summer Olympics
Olympic medalists in tennis
People from Hampstead
Medalists at the 1912 Summer Olympics
Tennis people from Greater London